Neo-Hasidism, Neochassidut, or Neo-Chassidus, is an approach to Judaism in which people learn beliefs and practices of Hasidic Judaism, and incorporate it into their own lives or prayer communities, yet without formally joining a Hasidic group. Over the last century neo-Hasidism was popularized by the works of writers such as Hillel Zeitlin, Martin Buber, Abraham Joshua Heschel, Lawrence Kushner, Zalman Schachter-Shalomi, and Arthur Green.

Neo-Hasidism is not a denomination of Judaism, but rather an approach to Judaism which can be found in all movements of Judaism, Orthodox and non-Orthodox. Among non-Orthodox Jews one can find adherents of neo-Hasidism in Conservative, Reform, Reconstructionism, and Aleph: The Alliance for Jewish Renewal.

In the 1970s and 1980s a similar movement amongst baalei teshuva— within more "traditional" Orthodoxy—was observed in the US,
 
influenced by Shlomo Carlebach, Aryeh Kaplan, Zvi Aryeh Rosenfeld and others, and reflecting the prevailing counterculture movement. To some extent, it has persisted to this day in such phenomena as the Carlebach minyan and the growth in the Breslov movement.

Early 20th century
Martin Buber helped initiate interest in Hasidism among modernized Jews through a series of books he wrote in the first decades of the 20th century, such as Tales of the Hasidim and the Legend of the Baal Shem Tov. In these books, Buber focused on the role of story telling and the charisma of early Hasidic masters as a vehicle for personal spirituality. As such, these books represent one aspect of Buber's larger project of creating a new form of personalistic, existential religiosity. Buber came under considerable criticism, especially from younger contemporary Gershom Scholem, for having interpreted Hasidism in an eccentric way that misrepresented Hasidic belief and literature. Nevertheless, Buber's sympathetic treatment of Hasidism proved attractive to many and started the 20th century romance between (idealized) Hasidism and non-Orthodox Jews.

Post-World War II

Following World War II, when the Hasidic centers of Central and Eastern Europe were decimated, some of the surviving communities relocated to America, creating new opportunities for American Jews to have direct experience with them, their practices and their beliefs. Most of these communities remained determinedly insular, but a few, primarily the Chabad and Bratslav (or Breslov) Hasidim, adopted an attitude of outreach to the larger Jewish community, seeking to win more Jews to the Hasidic way of life. 

In the 1950s the Lubavitcher Rebbe (Menachem Mendel Shneerson) started commissioning young Chabadniks to seek out and teach young secular and religiously liberal Jews. Two of the early "shluchim" were Zalman Schachter-Shalomi and Shlomo Carlebach. While Carlebach, a charismatic singer who used music as his tool, stayed (largely) within the circle of the Orthodox community from which he arose, Schachter-Shalomi charted an increasingly independent course, leaving Chabad to eventually study at Hebrew Union College (HUC), the leading academic institution of Reform Judaism, and to found what became Jewish Renewal.

Equally important was Abraham Joshua Heschel, a Holocaust refugee and scion of Hasidic royalty, who began his academic career in America with a life-saving but difficult wartime stint at HUC. In 1946, he moved to the Jewish Theological Seminary of America, the intellectual center for Conservative Judaism. There he still found himself marginalized for his Hasidic interests and customs, yet he surrounded himself with a small circle of devoted students (and eventual congregational rabbis) drawn to his mystically flavored phenomenology. As the 1960s began, Heschel was achieving increasing recognition as a theologian of stature with the publication of his books God in Search of Man and The Prophets. With that fame came an interest in his Hasidic roots and their role in his teachings. His social activism in the 1960s and 1970s further endeared him to many young Jews.

1960s and 1970s
Several of Heschel's students at JTS during the turbulent 1960s and early 1970s eventually became involved in the embryonic Havurah movement, a loosely defined project of creating an alternative, informal type of Jewish community first proposed by Reform theologian Jakob Petuchowski in the 1960s. While the movement spanned a broad spectrum of spiritual proclivities, some Jews in the founding circles, like Arthur Waskow, Arthur Green, and Michael Lerner, under the combined influence of Heschel and Schachter-Shalomi, took up the project of further exploring Hasidism and recasting it in an American idiom. Havurat Shalom, the flagship of this experimental quasi-communal movement which was started jointly by Green and Schachter-Shalomi in Boston, produced the greatest artifact of Havurah Judaism, the Jewish Catalog series, a set of three books devoted to "do-it-yourself" Judaism, written with a healthy dose of information and enthusiasm for things Hasidic.Havurah communities influenced by Hasidism were also influenced by Kabbalah.

These future neo-Hasids focused on selected attractive aspects of traditional Hasidism while rejecting teachings they found incompatible with modern egalitarian commitments, such as Hasidism's attitudes toward women, sexuality, and non-Jews. A few of these devotees, like Waskow and Lerner, became writers of note and public square intellectuals in the Jewish community and in the Jewish Renewal movement. Others, such as Green and Lawrence Fine, became leading scholars in the Jewish academic world, bringing an appreciation of Hasidism and an interest in adapting its ideas and customs to contemporary mores and life. 

Through books like Tormented Master, The Language of Truth and Your Word Is Fire, Arthur Green (and others) made Hasidism both more accessible and compelling for Jews seeking personal spirituality amidst the outwardly focused and sometimes spiritually dry world of the formal American Jewish community. Among the liberal movements, the Reform community remained resistant to this trend for a longer period, but a few rabbis, such as Herbert Weiner and Lawrence Kushner, also started translating Hasidism into a Reform idiom, expanding its influence.

This overlapping of amorphous interest in Hasidism among academics, seekers, religious functionaries, intellectuals, "alternative" rabbis and teachers, has led to the coining of the term "Neo-Hasidism (NH)."

A few formalized groups and institutions, such as P'nai Or congregation in Philadelphia, Pennsylvania and Elat Chayyim Retreat Center in Falls Village, CT, are heavily influenced by NH. NH also enjoyed a period of pre-eminence at the Reconstructionist Rabbinical Seminary (RRC) during Arthur Green's tenure there as dean.

In Modern Orthodoxy
In the past several years, many in modern-Orthodoxy began exploring the texts and way of life of Chasidic masters. Most notable are the Chabad works and the writings of Rabbi Nachman of Breslov.  Rabbi Moshe Weinberger, founding rabbi of Congregation Aish Kodesh in Woodmere, New York, is widely considered the "senior spokesman" of the Neo-Hasidic movement in Modern Orthodoxy.

Similarities and differences with Hasidism 

By definition, neo-Hasidic Judaism has significant differences from Hasidic Judaism. 

Hasidic Jews view their rebbe as a person who is literally in a state of devekut (communion) with God in a way that most people are not; that a rebbe (or tzaddik) has purged his heart of the Evil Inclination. Further, Hasidim compare their Rebbe with God, in that the tzaddik becomes a channel for the divine will.  

“A tzadik is like the creator, he is unified in the lower and higher worlds.” Hillel Halevi of Paritch

“The will of God and the will of the tzadik are one“. Dov Ber of Mezeritch

In contrast, these beliefs are completely rejected by neo-Hasidism. Adherents of neo-Hasidic Judaism view their rabbis and prayer group leaders as people who are superior only in academic credentials - for instance, someone with rabbinic ordination and an academic record of studies in some topic (liturgy, rabbinic literature etc.) is respected as an academic. No human is considered to be more holy than any other. Neo-Hasidism aims to be more egalitarian.

Neo-Hasidim reject the Hasidic doctrine of bonding with the Tzadik (התקשרות לצדיקים); Hasidic Jews view their Rebbe as an intermediary between God and man (albeit in a functional and not an essential sense). Hasidic Jews are seek to bind themselves to God by virtue of being bound to their rebbe. Such ideas are largely rejected by Jews outside of Hasidic Judaism, including by neo-Hasidism.

Neo-Hasidim reject the Hasidic doctrine of dynastic succession. In Hasidic communities, the son (or son-in-law) of a Rebbe usually becomes the next rebbe. In contrast, this dynastic succession is rejected by neo-Hasidim.

Neo-Hasidim reject the Orthodox doctrine of strict gender differentiation in observance. In Hasidic Judaism, most mitzvot, including wearing tallitot, tefillin, singing Birkat HaMazon, writing a mezuzah scroll, and teaching Torah to groups including men are done by only men. Neo-Hasidism allows women to do some or all of these. In non-Orthodox neo-Hasidism, women are equal to men in every way: they can count in a minyan and be a shaliach tzibbur. In Modern Orthodox neo-Hasidic groups, women may not count in a minyan or be a shaliach tzibbur, in
alignment with Orthodox Jewish law.

See also
Jewish denominations
Jewish Renewal
Arthur Green
Gershom Scholem (Began 20th-century academic discipline to study Jewish mysticism)
Elie Wiesel (Neo-Hasidic literature and mystical theodicy of silence)
Jewish philosophy (Buber and Heschel articulate theology in terms of Jewish existentialism)
Kabbalah#Neo-Hasidic
Carlebach minyan
Diaspora Yeshiva

References

External links
 A New Hasidism: Roots
NeoHasid.org "Chasidus without Border" – Rabbi David Seidenberg's site on Chasidic music and eco-Torah
Shtibl Minyan "an egalitarian community whose davening attempts to fulfill the joyous Hassidic ideal of kol atzmotai tomarnah 'with all my limbs I will say praise.' "
Berman Jewish Policy Archive @ NYU Wagner Sidney Schwarz's article on reconstructionism and neo-Hasidism
Devekut.com A compendium of Neo-Hasidic thought

Hasidic Judaism
Jewish philosophy
Jewish Renewal
Modern Orthodox Judaism